is a 1953 Japanese horror film directed by Ryohei Arai. It was filmed in Black and White, academy ratio format (full screen). It was never dubbed in English, nor shown in the United States theatrically.

Cast
 Kōtarō Bandō
 Kunitarō Sawamura
 Shōsaku Sugiyama
 Shintarō Nanjō
 Takako Irie
 Kazuko Fushimi
 Yōko Wakasugi

Release
The film was released theatrically in Japan on September 3, 1953, by Daiei Film and on DVD in July 2004.

References

External links 
 
 

Japanese horror films
Japanese black-and-white films
1953 films
1950s ghost films
Daiei Film films
Films directed by Ryohei Arai
Films set in country houses
1953 horror films
Japanese haunted house films
1950s Japanese films